Himantolophus litoceras is a species of footballfish, a type of anglerfish. It is endemic to the waters surrounding New Zealand.

This fish was first described in 2010 by Andrew Stewart and Theodore Pietsch, from a single specimen taken in seas off the northernmost tip of New Zealand's North Island. The species epithet, litoceras, derives from two Greek words, litos ("simple" or "plain") and keras ("horn") and describes the species escal appendages as being simple.

References

Himantolophidae
Fish described in 2010
Taxa named by Theodore Wells Pietsch III
Endemic marine fish of New Zealand